"Second Son" is a 2011 short story by  British author Jim Grant (who writes under the pen name of Lee Child). The story, which features Jack Reacher, is a prequel to the novel series and gives a glimpse of the teen-age Reacher. "Second Son" was released originally for the Kindle and, in 2017, was included in No Middle Name, a collection of Jack Reacher short stories. "Second Son" was bundled with the movie Jack Reacher as a Target Exclusive, when the movie was released on Blu-ray on 7 May 2013.

Plot

Paris
It is 1974. In Paris a 90-year-old man, the retired furniture restorer and World War I veteran Laurent Moutier, is unable to get out of bed and realises he is about to die. He faces stoically and unflinchingly the approach of death, mainly concerned about letting his daughter Josephine know. This takes some effort since she is married to an American military officer who is a member of US Marine Corps and she is constantly moving around the world with her husband on his different assignments. Her married name is Josephine Reacher; she is Jack Reacher's mother, and the dying Laurent Moutier is therefore his grandfather.

Okinawa
The story then moves to give a snapshot of the life of the 13-year-old Reacher and his family, having newly arrived at a military base in Okinawa. His father, Captain Stan Reacher, is to take command of a unit which would take part in an invasion of China, should the US get into war with that country.

The bad news from Paris, prompting Josephine to immediately take the first plane there, is compounded by a string of various kinds of trouble hitting members of the family. Reacher and his 15-year-old brother Joe ran afoul of the neighbourhood bully, an earlier-arrived American boy who takes "a toll" of anyone going to swim in the sea. Reacher is not intimidated by him – but Helen, the girl from a neighbouring house to whom Reacher takes a liking, is terrified. Then, Joe is accused of stealing the text of entry examinations from the school where they are due to enroll, dimming his prospects in this school. And most seriously of all, the classified code book of the unit of Stan, the father, has gone astray. Unless it can be recovered swiftly, Stan's military career would be in jeopardy.

In this multiple crisis, the young Reacher already displays both the sharp detective ability and the fighting prowess which will characterise him as a grown-up. Moreover, while just 13 years old, he displays enough self-confidence and force of personality to make a detail of grown-up military policemen follow through on the leads he offers them. Within a few hours, all problems are neatly tied up: the bully is sent to hospital with several broken ribs, his reign of terror at a definite end; Joe is completely cleared of the charge of cheating; the missing code book is duly recovered, with Stan cleared of any responsibility for its having gone astray; and Reacher is rewarded by getting to kiss Helen.

Themes

The story's action is interspersed with contemplative moments, such as when grandfather Laurent recounts that "… a great war leaves a country with three armies: an army of cripples, an army of mourners, and an army of thieves."

Reacher is saddened by the (expected) news that his grandfather had died; he had met the old Laurent several times and liked him. At the same time, Reacher figures that a guy who had survived unscathed the battles of Verdun and The Somme and later the Nazi occupation of France, and who lived to age 90, "has already beaten the odds". Jack Reacher's pragmatic attitude toward issues of life and death is, in fact, similar to that displayed by Laurent himself.

The story is partially set in Okinawa and notably includes no character of the island's local inhabitants. The plot takes place solely within the enclave of American military personnel and their family members on the island.

Before the final encounter with the bully in the street, Jack Reacher wraps his hands with electrical wire to weight his fists for a more powerful strike.  After removing the wire back at his house, "Reacher saw he had the word Georgia stamped backward across one of his knuckles.  Must have been where the wire was manufactured.  Raised lettering on the insulation.  A place he had never been." This is an allusion to Child's first book, Killing Floor, in which he travels to Margrave, Georgia, looking for the town in which Blind Blake (a favourite musician of both Reacher and his brother, Joe) is said to have died.  These events are also referred to in the novel, The Affair, which occurs just before the storyline of Killing Floor.

References

External links
 Review by Bookhound
 Random House review
 Review by Reader Store

Jack Reacher books
Fictional secret agents and spies
Fictional soldiers
Novels about the United States Marine Corps
United States Armed Forces in Okinawa Prefecture